Evelyn's Love Adventures (German: Die Liebesabenteuer der schönen Evelyne) is a 1921 German silent thriller film directed by Richard Eichberg and starring Lee Parry, Max Wogritsch and Aruth Wartan.

The film's sets were designed by the art director Jacek Rotmil.

Cast
 Lee Parry as Evelyne Burkhard
 Max Wogritsch as Walter Mautner, ihr Jugendfreund
 Aruth Wartan as Rolf Burkhard, Evelynes Bruder, lebt als Werner Haßfeld
 Felix Hecht as Dr. Helmuth Raimer
 Karl Falkenberg as Werner Haßfeld
 Syme Delmar as Margot Holmes, Haßfelds Braut
 Gerhard Ritterband as Bob 
 Josef Commer
 Oskar Sima

References

Bibliography
 Grange, William. Cultural Chronicle of the Weimar Republic. Scarecrow Press, 2008.

External links

1921 films
Films of the Weimar Republic
Films directed by Richard Eichberg
German silent feature films
1920s thriller films
German thriller films
German black-and-white films
Silent thriller films
1920s German films